O Outro Lado do Paraíso (title in English: The Other Side of Paradise) is a Brazilian telenovela created by Walcyr Carrasco, which premiered on TV Globo on 23 October 2017, replacing A Força do Querer, and ended on 11 May 2018, being replaced by Segundo Sol.

The telenovela features an ensemble cast headed by Bianca Bin, Sérgio Guizé, Rafael Cardoso, Grazi Massafera, Érika Januza, Emílio de Mello, Thiago Fragoso, Glória Pires, Marieta Severo and Fernanda Montenegro.

Plot 

The plot has two phases and begins in Tocantins. The first phase, set in 2007, presents the teacher Clara (Bianca Bin), an innocent young orphan who lives with her grandfather, a bar owner Josafá (Lima Duarte) in Jalapão. She meets Gael (Sergio Guizé), an heir to a decaying family of Palmas, and ends up falling in love with him. However, Clara suffers from his explosive and extremely sexist temper and but ends up being advised by Sophia (Marieta Severo), her mother-in-law, to be understanding. Behind Sophia's demureness, which is just a facade, hides an ambition for the lands of Josafá, where a depleted emerald mine has been discovered, in which neither he nor his granddaughter have the least interest in exploiting after a tragedy that causes Clara's father and son of Josafá, Jonas (Eucir de Souza) to perish. Sophia, a domineering, self-willed, cunning and false woman, plans a plan to get rid of Clara, eventually putting her daughter-in-law in a psychiatric clinic for 10 years.

The second phase, set in the present time, presents Clara trying to escape from the psychiatric clinic, without understanding how she got there, but discovers she was the victim of a major coup. She meets with the mysterious Beatriz (Nathalia Timberg), her only friend. He meets Renato (Rafael Cardoso), a friend in love with her, who will help her in her revenge plan against seven people: Sophia, Gael, the sensual and dangerous sister-in-law Livia (Grazi Massafera), Judge Gustavo (Luís Melo) and his wife Nádia (Eliane Giardini), psychiatrist Samuel (Eriberto Leão) and delegate Vinicius (Flávio Tolezani), while trying to find again her son Tomaz (Vitor Figueiredo), father and grandmother, some of Clara's foes.

Production 
Cauã Reymond and Carolina Dieckmann were featured main roles in the plot, but the first declined because of movie commitments, while Dieckmann preferred to accept an invitation to the next telenova by Aguinaldo Silva. Both were replaced by Rafael Cardoso and Grazi Massafera. Nathalia Dill was invited shortly afterwards for the role, but also refused, claiming that she needed time to rest her image since she had just starred in 'Rock Story'. Maitê Proença was one of those who left the cast later. The actress Laís Pinho was announced for the cast of the plot, but in August it was announced that she would act in the next telenovela by Record, O Apocalipse.

The release of a part of the plot synopsis caused some estrangement from the resemblance to the American soap opera La Patrona. Both have in common the fact that the girl is hospitalized in a psychiatric clinic by the villain of the plot.

Cast 

 Bianca Bin as Clara Tavares
 Sérgio Guizé as Gael Montserrat
 Marieta Severo as Sophia Montserrat
 Glória Pires as Elizabeth Montserrat
 Rafael Cardoso as Renato Laureiro
 Grazi Massafera as Lívia Montserrat
 Lima Duarte as Josafá Tavares
 Fernanda Montenegro as Mercedes Alcântara
 Thiago Fragoso as Patrick de Sá Junqueira
 Eliane Giardini as Nádia Vasconcelos
 Caio Paduan as Bruno Vasconcelos
 Érika Januza as Raquel Custódio
 Nathalia Timberg as Beatriz de Sá Junqueira
 Juliano Cazarré as Mariano
 Flávio Tolezani as Vinicius Gomes
 Eriberto Leão as Samuel dos Passos
 Luís Melo as Gustavo Vasconcelos
 Julia Dalavia as Adriana Montserrat
 Emílio de Mello as Henrique Montserrat
 Juca de Oliveira as Natanael Montserrat
 Bárbara Paz as Joana Medeiros
 Laura Cardoso as Madame Caetana
 Zezé Motta as Mãe Quilombo
 Anderson di Rizzi as Juvenal
 Pedro Carvalho as Amaro Antunes
 Arthur Aguiar as Diego Vasconcelos
 Genésio de Barros as Raúl Ignácio Barros
 Juliana Caldas as Julia de Aguiar Monserrat
 Ana Lúcia Torre as Adneia dos Passos
 Tainá Müller as Aura
 Ellen Rocche as Suzana
 Fábio Lago as Nick
 Mayana Neiva as Leandra
 Bella Piero as Laura Sandoval
 Rafael Zulu as Aparecido
 Fernanda Rodrigues as Fabiana de Sá Junqueira
 Igor Angelkorte as Rafael
 Giovana Cordeiro as Cleo Alcântara
 Sandra Corveloni as Lorena Sandoval
 Vera Mancini as Rosalinda
 Sérgio Fonta as Amaral
 Malu Rodrigues as Karina 
 César Ferrario as Rato
 Felipe Titto as Odilo 
 Narjara Turetta as Zildete 
 Alexandre Rodrigues as Valdo
 Rafael Losso as Zé Victor

Soundtrack

Volume 1 

O Outro Lado do Paraíso Vol. 1 is the first soundtrack of the telenovela, released on 10 November 2017 by Som Livre.

Volume 2 

O Outro Lado do Paraíso Vol. 2 is the second soundtrack of the telenovela, released on 20 February 2018 by Som Livre.

Ratings

Awards and nominations

References

External links
  
 

Brazilian telenovelas
TV Globo telenovelas
2017 telenovelas
2017 Brazilian television series debuts
Telenovelas by Walcyr Carrasco
Brazilian LGBT-related television shows
2018 Brazilian television series endings
Television shows filmed in Tocantins
Portuguese-language telenovelas
Television series about revenge